Kappa Centauri (κ Cen, κ Centauri) is a binary star in the southern constellation of Centaurus. With an apparent visual magnitude of +3.14, it can be viewed with the naked eye on a dark night.

This is a spectroscopic binary system where the presence of an orbiting companion is revealed by shifts in the absorption lines caused by the Doppler effect. The primary component is a huge star, with about seven times the Sun's mass and four times the Sun's radius. It has a stellar classification of B2 IV, indicating that it is in the subgiant stage of its stellar evolution. An effective temperature of 19,800 K in the outer envelope is what gives it the blue-white hue of a B-type star.

The primary is a candidate Beta Cephei variable that shows line-profile variations in its spectrum. However, the nature of the variability remains uncertain because of the binary nature of the system. As of 2007, the secondary component was separated from the primary by 0.128 arcseconds at a position angle of 156°. It has about 68% of the mass of the primary. This system is a proper motion member of the Upper Centaurus–Lupus sub-group in the Scorpius–Centaurus OB association, the nearest such co-moving association of massive stars to the Sun.

From this Chinese name, the name Ke Kwan has appeared.

See also
 Traditional Chinese star names

References

Centauri, Kappa
B-type subgiants
Centaurus (constellation)
Spectroscopic binaries
Upper Centaurus Lupus
Beta Cephei variables
5576
132200
073334
Durchmusterung objects